Goose Lake is a lake in Marquette County, Michigan, in the United States.

Goose Lake was so named from the fact its outline resembles a goose in flight.

See also
List of lakes in Michigan

References

Lakes of Michigan
Lakes of Marquette County, Michigan